Warriors of Future, previously known as Virtus, is a 2022 Hong Kong science fiction action film directed by visual effects artist Ng Yuen-fai in his directorial debut and starring Louis Koo, Sean Lau, and Carina Lau. Koo also serves as the film's producer, with the film being funded and distributed by his production company, One Cool Group Limited.

Having been in development for three years, the film began production on 12 February 2017 and was originally set for release in 2019. After a long delay, the film opened the 46th Hong Kong International Film Festival on 15 August 2022 
and released theatrically on 25 August 2022 in Hong Kong.

The film became the No. 1 highest-grossing Chinese film in Hong Kong, The box office record was then broken by A Guilty Conscience in February 2023.

Plot
In 2055, wars have ravaged the Earth due to the prevalent use of advanced military robots, and global warming and pollution have destroyed the environment and ruined the atmosphere. As a result, many people are born with birth defects and die, and large domes known as Skynets are built to protect the surviving cities on Earth. During the construction of the Skynet over B-16 (a futuristic Hong Kong), a meteor lands in the city and a giant alien plant, later named Pandora, emerges and causes devastation to the area around it as it takes root. Pandora grows rapidly when there is rain, taking over more of the city every time it does so; however, it is discovered that the plant can also purify the polluted air. ASU's (a local military force) lead scientist, Dr Chan, finds a way to alter the plant's genome to stop Pandora from growing further while also letting it continue to repair the atmosphere.

Tyler and his friend Johnson Cheng, soldiers working for the ASU, are tasked with locating Pandora's pistil and delivering a "gene bullet" virus that will neutralize its growth. Colonel Tam is sent to oversee the operation, but she has a backup plan to bomb Pandora from the air, which would destroy the plant but could potentially kill a hundred and sixty thousand people in the surrounding area. Cheng heavily opposes the idea of sacrificing civilians and losing their best chance to fix the atmosphere, and launches the mission before two rainstorms hit the city. Privates Connor and Lincoln join Tyler on the mission as they escort the Orca transport aircraft carrying the gene bullet virus into the operation area. During the mission, Sean Li, the commander in chief of B-16 and the architect of the Skynet project, sabotages the Orca by remotely taking control of its complement of military robots as soon as the first storm hits, and it crashes into a building. Damaged by Pandora's tendrils, Tyler's aircraft crashes after locating the area where the pistil is, and Lincoln is left critically injured.

Connor and Tyler look for medical supplies at an abandoned hospital, where they are attacked by mantis-like creatures which kill Lincoln. Connor hides in the mortuary while Tyler retreats to an emergency room where he rescues an orphaned girl, Pansy, who reminds Tyler of his daughter Sissy, who had died of pollution-caused illness. Cheng, arriving in an armoured car driven by former-squad mate Skunk, uses a hatchet to kill most of the mantis-like creatures while Tyler rescues Connor. The survivors escape the hospital and head to the building where the Orca crashed, finding the last intact gene bullet capsule and evidence that Li had sabotaged the mission in order to allow Pandora to be destroyed and the construction of his Skynets to continue. The team contact Li, saying that they have the evidence of his sabotage, but Li proposes a challenge: to beat him, they will have to go against the military robots under his control.

As the team race towards the location of the pistil, Li sends several tank-like and humanoid robots after the armoured car. As Skunk drives on, Tyler, Connor and Cheng fight off the robots, and Cheng becomes separated from the group after being thrown out of the car. The others arrive at the location where the pistil is and encounter a large crab-like robot, with its pulse weapon destroying the armoured car. Connor, Skunk and Tyler fight off more humanoid robots and destroy the crab-like robot, and Cheng returns and saves Pansy. Cheng enters the pistil chamber just as Pandora begins to grow uncontrollably as the second storm hits. Cheng unleashes the gene bullet virus onto Pandora, stopping it from growing further. Colonel Tam suspends the backup plan after discovering Li's sabotage, and Li commits suicide before she can arrest him. Afterwards, with the state of the atmosphere greatly improving, Tyler accepts a mission on the moon while Skunk and Cheng finish rebuilding the armoured car.

Cast
Louis Koo as Tyler, principal force of B-16's Air Force who possesses extraordinary skills in operating fighter jets. His daughter died due to environmental pollution spiraling out of control, resulting him becoming very hot-tempered.
Sean Lau as Johnson Cheng, commander of B-16's Air Force and Tyler's brother-in-arms who is always determined to never give up and believes soldiers are more reliable than robots.
Carina Lau as Tam Bing, a colonel sent to District B-16 to execute the genetics alteration project.
Philip Keung as Yau Tai-long, nicknamed Skunk, a former member of B-16's Air Force who was dismissed after committing a major mistake and became at odds with Tyler. He was later recruited by Johnson to rejoin the force to participate in the plan to alter the genetics of "Pandora".
Tse Kwan-ho as Dr. Chan Chong-Chung, a scientist who successfully examines the genetic map of "Pandora".
Janice Wu
Wan Guopeng as Connor Kwong, a junior member of B-16's Air Force and Tyler's subordinate.
Nick Cheung as Sean Lee, commander in chief of District B-16 and the main driving force of Project Skynet. (guest appearance)
Eddy Ko
Sakurako Okubo

Production
The film was first announced in May 2015 under the title Virtus to be directed by Benny Chan and starring Louis Koo. Koo's film production company, One Cool Film Production worked on the film's visual effects, under a budget of HK$300 million. Although filming was set to begin in the end of 2015, a teaser trailer was released which featured Koo in a robot suit.

Production began on 12 February 2017 on a set in Shenzhen which took two months to build. The film is directed by visual effects artist Ng Yuen-fai, who worked on the special effects for The Warlords, Bodyguards and Assassins and The White Storm. Aside from Koo, the cast also includes Sean Lau and Philip Keung, alongside newcomer actors Kevin Chu, Ng Siu-hin and Tony Wu. In March 2017, One Cool Film Production released a making of featurette teaser displaying its new title, Warriors of Future, and revealing the film's 36 month pre-production and its new budget of US$45 million. According to the teaser, production for the film is slated to take 4 months to complete while post-production will take 18 months. The film's four month shoot in Shenzhen completed in June 2017 and resumed its shoot in Hong Kong in August 2017. In March 2018, a new teaser trailer for the film was released. Aside from previous announced cast members, the trailer also featured new cast members such as Carina Lau, Nick Cheung and Tse Kwan-ho. On the same day, it was also reported that the film's production has increased to US$56 million. In March 2019, One Cool Film Production released a new trailer for the film.

Release
Warriors of Future opened the 46th Hong Kong International Film Festival along with the film, Where the Wind Blows, on 15 August 2022 before its theatrical release on 25 August 2022 in Hong Kong in IMAX, 4DX and CFGS formats. The film was originally set for theatrical release in 2019, but its release was delayed for three years in order to allow time for post-production. On 10 December 2021, One Cool Pictures released a promotional clip featuring former TVB News anchor Vince Ng in a mock news clip reporting a meteorite is approaching the Earth and is projected to hit the Hong Kong at 8 PM on 17 December 2021, which was when a new trailer for the film premiered on billboard screens throughout Hong Kong before being available on the internet, displaying a slated release year of 2022.

Netflix acquired the global distribution rights for the film and released it for streaming on 2 December 2022.

Reception

Box office
Warriors of Future has grossed a total of US$111.2 million worldwide combining its box office gross from Hong Kong (US$10.5 million), and China (US$100.73 million).

Warriors of Future has grossed 310 million CNY (HK$356 million, US$45 million) in mainland China as of 14 August 2022, and HK$6.2 million in Hong Kong preview screenings between 19 and 21 August 2022. The film earned a three-day gross US$9.8 million during the weekend of 26–28 August 2022 and was placed at No. 7 at the global box office of the weekend. Some box office analysts estimated the film would need to make HK$1.2 billion (US$153 million) globally to break even.

In Hong Kong, the film debuted at No. 1 on its opening weekend with HK$19,703,177 (US$2,511,463) during its first four days of release and a total gross of HK$21,784,237 ($2,776,725) at the end of the week including preview showings. It also became the biggest opening for a local film at the Hong Kong box office since the beginning of the COVID-19 pandemic. The film remained at No. 1 in its second weekend grossing HK$22,266,042 (US$2,838,138) and have grossed a total of HK$44,069,479 (US$5,617,310) by then. The film moved down to No. 2 in its third weekend, grossing a HK$9,484,285 (US$1,208,374), and accumulating a total gross of HK$53,553,764 (US$6,823,179) by then. During its fourth weekend, the film grossed HK$6,823,127 (US$869,277) while remaining at No. 2, and have grossed a total of HK$60,376,891 (US$7,692,108) by then. The film stayed at No. 2 during its fifth weekend with a gross of HK$3,003,071 (US$382,586), and have accumulated a total gross of HK$63,379,962 (US$8,074,498) by then.

In six weeks since the opening of the film, the cumulative box office exceeded HK$66.84 million Hong Kong dollars, breaking the box office record of Cold War II of 66.82 million, becoming the No. 1 highest-grossing Chinese film in Hong Kong. During its eighth weekend, the film continued to remain at No. 2 with a gross of HK$3,338,619 (US$425,307), and accumulated a total gross of HK$68,856,200 (US$8,771,602) by then. The film continued to remain at No. 2 on its ninth weekend with an increased gross of HK$4,495,621 (US$572,691), and have grossed a total of HK$73,351,821 (US$9,344,181) so far, becoming the first domestic film to gross pass HK$70 million in Hong Kong.

The film dropped to No. 3 on its tenth weekend while still grossing a strong HK$3,115,109 (US$396,854), and have accumulated a total gross of HK$76,466,930 (US$9,741,630) by then. On its eleventh weekend, the film grossed HK$1,579,312 (US$201,222), coming in at No. 4, and have grossed a total of HK$78,046,242 (US$9,943,970) by then. The film remained at No. 4 in its twelfth with a gross of HK$1,412,898 (US$179,994), accumulating a total gross of HK$79,475,140 (US$10,124,609) by then. During its thirteenth weekend, the film grossed HK$805,648 (US$102,808) at No. 5, and have accumulated a total of gross HK$80,280,788 (US$10,244,600), becoming the first domestic film in Hong Kong to pass the HK$80 million The film remained at No. 5 in its fourteenth weekend with a gross of HK$754,115 (US$96,410), while having accumulated a total gross of HK$81,034,903 (US$10,360,002) by then. During its fifteenth weekend, the film dropped to No. 8 with a gross of HK$397,698 (US$50,899), and have accumulated a total gross of HK$81,432,601 (US$10,422,172) by then. The film came in at No. 10 in its sixteenth weekend with a gross of HK$273,422 (US$35,104), while having grossed a total of HK$81,706,023 (US$10,490,328) so far.

Critical response
Rotten Tomatoes, a review aggregator, reports that 100% of five surveyed critics gave the film a positive review; the average rating is 6.5/10.  Edmund Lee of the South China Morning Post gave the film a score of 3/5 stars and praises the film's visual effects as groundbreaking and a milestone in Hong Kong cinema while criticizing the film's lack of fresh ideas.

Awards and nominations

Notes

References

External links
 
 
 
 
 

2022 science fiction action films
Hong Kong science fiction action films
Military science fiction films
Robot films
Media Asia films
Cantonese-language films
IMAX films
4DX films
Alien invasions in films
Post-apocalyptic films
Films about extraterrestrial life
Films set in 2055
Films set in Hong Kong
Films shot in Hong Kong
Films shot in Guangdong